Reginald MacGilla Finin was an Irish priest: he is the earliest known Archdeacon of Clogher and was to have been Bishop of Clogher but his election was set aside.

References

13th-century Irish Roman Catholic priests
Archdeacons of Clogher